Gonzalo Aquilino Pintos (born 20 February 2000) is an Argentine professional footballer who plays as a forward for Deportivo Merlo, on loan from Defensores de Belgrano.

Career
Aquilino started his career with Primera B Metropolitana's Defensores de Belgrano. He was moved into their first-team in October 2017 by Fabián Nardozza, who selected the forward for his professional debut on 15 October 2017 during a defeat to San Telmo. In his next appearance, three days later, he scored his first senior goal as Defensores de Belgrano beat Colegiales 1–0. He was selected for the final time in 2017–18 in March 2018 for the return fixture with San Telmo, receiving a red card three minutes after being substituted on for Gonzalo Jaque; in a season which the club ended with promotion to Primera B Nacional. Ahead of the 2022 season, Aquilino was loaned out to Primera B Metropolitana side Deportivo Merlo until the end of the year.

Career statistics
.

References

External links

2000 births
Living people
Place of birth missing (living people)
Argentine footballers
Association football forwards
Primera B Metropolitana players
Defensores de Belgrano footballers
Deportivo Merlo footballers